Neti Bharatam is a 1983 film written and directed by T. Krishna and produced by Eetharam Films. It is a musical hit film promoting liberal ideals. Lyrics for the songs were penned by revolutionary poet Srirangam Srinivasa Rao, Adrushta Deepak who was then an unknown lyricist, and music scored by K. Chakravarthy. The movie is most famous for the song "Maanavatvam Parimalinche", which got the lyricist Adrushta Deepak noticed. Suman and Vijayashanti played lead roles, with Nagabhushanam and Rajyalakshmi in assisting roles. The film was remade in Kannada as Indina Bharatha, Hindi as Haqeeqat (1985) and in Tamil as Puthiya Theerppu (1985). The film won six Nandi Awards.

Songs
 Ardharatri Swatantram Andhakaara BandhuramAngangam Dopidaina Kannatalli JeevitamIde Ide Neti Bharatam Bharatamata JeevitamBharata Matanu Nenu Bandinai Padiunnaanu (Lyrics: Sri Sri; Music: K. Chakravarthi)
 Chitti Potti
 Dammu Thoti Daggu Thoti ChalijoramosteAtto Podam Rave Manavoori Davakhanaku (Lyrics: B. Krishna Murthy; Music: K. Chakravarthi)
 Manavatvam Parimalinche Manchi Manasuku SwagatamBratuku Artham Teliyajesina Manchi Manishiki Swagatam (Lyrics: Adrushta Deepak; Music: K. Chakravarthi)

Awards
Filmfare Awards South
 Filmfare Best Film Award (Telugu) - P. Venkateswara Rao.

Nandi Awards
 Second Best Feature Film - Silver - P. Venkateswara Rao.
 Best Music Director - K. Chakravarthy.
 Best Supporting Actor - P. L. Narayana.
 Best Screenplay Writer - T. Krishna
 Best First Film of a Director - T. Krishna
 Best Lyricist  - Sri Sri

References

External links
 aptalkies.com
 

1983 films
1980s Telugu-language films
Films scored by K. Chakravarthy
Films about social issues in India
Telugu films remade in other languages
Films directed by T. Krishna